Huelsman is a surname. Notable people with the surname include:

Frank Huelsman (1874–1959), American baseball player
Joanne Huelsman (born 1938), American politician

See also
Hulsman